Henry Hutchings (August 17, 1865 - July 17, 1939) was a soldier of the Iowa National Guard, officer of the Texas National Guard and U.S Army, founder of the Austin Evening News and Austin Statesman, Texas Secretary of State, and Adjutant General of Texas.

Early life and career 
Henry Hutchings was born in Somersetshire, England on August 17, 1865. In 1866, Hutchings and his family moved to Iowa. Hutchings joined the Iowa National Guard. Three years later, he moved to Texas and joined the Texas National Guard. In 1890, he founded and published the Austin Evening News and later published the Austin Statesman.

World War I
From January 23, 1911 to 1917, Hutchings was Adjutant General of Texas. In 1917, he resigned as adjutant general to command the 71st Infantry Brigade and was stationed in France.

Later life and political career 
After World War I, Hutchings was given command of the 71st Infantry Brigade and returned to Texas. He commanded the brigade until his retirement in 1927. In January 1925, Hutchings served as Secretary of State during the closing weeks of Governor Pat M. Neff's term.

From January 18, 1933 to January 15, 1935, he resumed Adjutant General of Texas position. Hutchings was executive officer in charge of the narcotics division of the Texas Department of Public Safety until his death.

Death and burial 
Hutchings died on July 27, 1935 in Austin Texas. He was buried at Texas State Cemetery in Austin.

Relations 
In 1886, Henry Hutchings married Whittie Brown and had seven children. Hutching remarried to Hallie White on March 9, 1935. One of Hutchings' sons, Henry Hutchings Jr. was an officer in the United States Army Corps of Engineers.

Personal life 
Henry Hutchings was an Episcopalian. He was a vestryman at St. David's Church in Austin, Texas for twenty years. He was the founder of the Austin Evening News and the Austin Statesman.

References

Bibliography 
Davis, Henry Blaine Jr. (1998). Generals in Khaki. Bur Oak, Circle, Raleigh, North Carolina: Pentland and Press. . 
Will Erwin ,"Henry Hutchings - A Long Way From Somerset" Texas State Cemetery
Lura N. Rouse, "HUTCHINGS, HENRY", Texas State Historical Asscioation

External links 

https://tshaonline.org/handbook/online/articles/fhu49

1865 births
1939 deaths
People from Somerset
United States Army generals
American male journalists
United States Army generals of World War I
Military personnel from Somerset
Burials in Texas
National Guard (United States) generals